Shoolini University of Biotechnology and Management Sciences, also known simply as Shoolini University, is a private university located near Kasauli in Solan district, Himachal Pradesh, 173229, India.

History
Shoolini University was established by an Act of Government of Himachal Pradesh in 2009 and it is recognised by the University Grants Commission (F No. 8-1/2010(CCP)-1/PU), dated 7.2. 2011)

Academics

Shoolini University is accredited by the University Grants Commission (UGC) and National Assessment & Accreditation Council (NAAC). Shoolini University has been recognized by Department of Industry, Science and Resources (DISR) as a functional Scientific and Industrial Research Organization. Shoolini University has consistently been ranked among India’s top universities as per MHRD NIRF, Times Higher Education (THE), Quacquarelli Symonds (QS) and SCImago rankings and is one of the highest generators of patents and innovation in India. Shoolini University offers courses in Biotechnology, Management Sciences, Liberal Arts, Engineering, Agriculture, Sciences, Food Technology, Pharmaceutical Sciences, Law and Yoga.

Departments
1. School of Agriculture

2. School of Bioengineering & Food Technology

3. School of Biotechnology

4. School of Mechanical, Civil and Electrical Engineering

5. Yogananda School of Ai Computer and Data Sciences

6. School of Business Management

7. Chitrakoot School of Liberal Arts 

8. School of Ancient Indian Wisdom and Yogic Studies

9. School of Journalism

10. School of Pharmaceutical Sciences

11. School of Biological and Environment Sciences

12. School of Physics and Materials Science

13. School of Advanced Chemical Sciences

14. School of Law

15. School of Design

Accreditation
Like all universities in India, Shoolini University is recognized by the University Grants Commission (UGC). The University also has accreditation from the Pharmacy Council of India (PCI). In 2016, the National Assessment and Accreditation Council accredited the university as B++.

Rankings

1. Ranked #351–400 globally and #2 in India in Times Higher Education World University Rankings 2023. 

2. Ranked #801-1000 globally in QS World University Rankings 2023 and #271-280 in QS Asian University Rankings 2022. 

3. Ranked between 101-200 in THE Impact Rankings 2022, 2nd in SDG 7 –Affordable and Clean Energy  and 6th in SDG 6-Clean Water and Sanitation. 

4. Ranked #514 globally by SCImago Institutions Rankings 2022, #17 among all Indian institutions in  research, India’s No.1 in Chemistry, 17 in Engineering. 

5. Ranked #431 globally in the category of citations per faculty and #480 in the Employer Reputation category (QS World University Rankings 2023).  

6. Ranked #1 in India and #6 in Asia in citations per paper (QS Asia University rankings 2022). 

7. Placed in the ‘excellent band’ in Atal Rankings of Institutions on Innovations and Achievements (2021). 

8. Diamond University Rating by QS I-Gauge 2022, Platinum in Innovation, Governance and Structure,  Social Responsibility and Facilities. 

9. Ranked #3 in India among all academic institutions in patent filing by the Indian Patent Office 2019. 

10. Ranked #89 among all Indian Universities by NIRF 2021.

Activities

SPRINT
The University runs a program called SPRINT (Skill Programming Through Rapid and Intensive Training) which is a specialized program mandatory for all university students, with the aim of preparing them for interviews and job placements. In 2017, the University completed its 100th SPRINT. In June 2020, Shoolini University was shortlisted for the Times Higher Education Asia Awards 2020 for the category “ Outstanding Student Support” for  its SPRINT Programme.

Guru Series of Lectures
Named after the Paramahansa Yogananda, the university has initiated a lecture series under the banner of 'Guru Series of Lectures'. Luminaries from various fields are called to the institution to address the students and faculty on topics of their interest. Some of the speakers who have spoken under this lecture series include Nobel Laureate Robert Huber, India's first woman IPS Officer Kiran Bedi, Kamal Davar, Yuvraj Singh, Vivek Mohan. and veteran actor Anupam Kher.

References

External links
 

Private universities in India
Universities in Himachal Pradesh
Educational institutions established in 2009
2009 establishments in Himachal Pradesh
Education in Solan district